Fontmell Magna is a village and civil parish in north Dorset, England. In the 2011 census the parish had a population of 734.

Toponymy
The name Fontmell derives from a Celtic river-name meaning 'spring by the bare hill', and Magna—meaning great—distinguishes this settlement from Fontmell Parva (parva meaning small), which is a few miles southwest in Child Okeford parish. In 877 Fontmell Magna was recorded as Funtemel, in 1086 in the Domesday Book it was Fontemale, and in 1391 it was Magnam Funtemell.

History
Evidence of early human presence occurs in the east and northeast of the parish in the form of earthworks on the chalk hills: these consist of three cross-dykes, a barrow and a mound that is also possibly a barrow.

In 932, King Æthelstan granted an estate at Fontmell to the nuns of Shaftesbury Abbey under the condition that they would sing 50 psalms after Prime and offer masses at Terce, for the king's intention.

Of settlements existing within the parish today, the earliest is the main village, which originated before the Norman Conquest. The Domesday Book of 1086 recorded that Fontemale was in Sixpenny Hundred; it had 3 mills, 68 households, and the estate's lord and tenant-in-chief was Shaftesbury Abbey. A land survey made by the abbey in about 1130–35 shows that the Fontmell Magna estate had 65 tenants, of whom 41 were villeins, each holding between half and one yardland, and the rest were cottagers, each with about four acres. The number of mills had increased to four. A second survey made in about 1170–80 shows the population had increased to 80 tenants, of whom 55 were villeins.

To the west of the main village, the hamlet of Bedchester is also of pre-Conquest origin, though the settlement furthest west in the parish, Hartgrove, wasn't recorded before 1254. Hill Farm, over the chalk hills in the east of the parish, first appears in records in 1333.

Governance
Fontmell Magna is in The Beacon electoral ward, which extends to Cann in the north, Sutton Waldron in the south and Guy's Marsh in the west. The ward, which had a population of 2,277 in the 2011 census, is part of the constituency of North Dorset, and is currently represented in the UK parliament by the Conservative Simon Hoare.

Geography
From west to east the underlying geology comprises Kimmeridge clay around Hartgrove, a ridge of Lower Greensand east of the Twyford Brook, Gault and Upper Greensand from the valley of the Fontmell Brook eastwards, and then the high chalk escarpment of Cranborne Chase. The chalk hill just outside the village to the east, Fontmell Down, is a nature reserve.

Climate
The Met Office has a climate station at Fontmell Magna.

Demography
In the 2011 census Fontmell Magna civil parish had 334 dwellings, 319 households and a population of 734.

The population of the parish in the censuses between 1921 and 2011 is shown in the table below:

Notable buildings
There are 45 structures within Fontmell Magna civil parish that have been listed by Historic England for their architectural or historical interest. There are no structures listed as Grade I – the designation of highest significance – but the parish church is designated as Grade II*. All the other listings are Grade II. In 1906 Sir Frederick Treves described the church as "one of the handsomest in Dorsetshire".

Notable residents
Lieutenant Philip Salkeld V.C., who was awarded the Victoria Cross for his role in blowing open the Kashmir Gate in Delhi, India, in 1857, was born and grew up in Fontmell Magna, where his father was the rector.

In 1930, art collector Lord Ivor Spencer-Churchill bought the Springhead estate near Fontmell Magna. In 1934, writer and rural revivalist Rolf Gardiner and his wife Marabel bought a cottage on the estate, which they farmed.  Gardiner was active in Dorset society, becoming a member of Dorset County Council between 1937–1946, High Sheriff of Dorset 1967–68, President of the Dorset Federation of Young Farmers Clubs 1944–46, a Chairman and then President of the Dorset branch of the Council for the Protection of Rural England between 1957-1972 as well as other rural and landscape committees and working parties.

The Gardiners' son, orchestral conductor Sir John Eliot Gardiner CBE FKC, was born in Fontmell Magna in 1943.

The village was also home to cinematographer Oswald Morris (1915–2014) in the last twenty years of his life.

References

External links 

Villages in Dorset
Civil parishes in Dorset